Jamie Noel Emmanuel Donnelly-Jackson (born 1 November 1986),  known as Jamie Jackson, is an English semi-professional footballer who plays as a striker for Grantham Town.

Career

Chesterfield
Born in Sheffield, South Yorkshire, Jackson started his career with Chesterfield after signing a three-year scholarship in 2003, before signing a two-year professional contract in April 2006. He made his first team debut after coming on as a 71st minute substitute in a 3–1 defeat to Port Vale on 29 April. He had loans with Matlock Town and Gainsborough Trinity, where he made four appearances during the 2007–08 season.

Matlock Town
He joined Matlock permanently in August 2008. He had a trial with Conference Premier team York City in July 2009 and played in the first half of a 3–3 draw with Leeds United in a pre-season friendly. He went on to score York's second goal in a 2–0 victory over Hartlepool United. He was told to leave Matlock by manager Mark Atkins in October, who criticised Jackson's attitude and conduct after having a trial with York while still being contracted by Matlock. He later had his contract cancelled by the club.

Worksop Town
In February 2010 he signed for Worksop Town, initially until the end of the season this was extended. Jamie also helped the club win their first trophy in 9 years scoring 2 goals at Hillsborough in the Sheffield Senior Cup final, as Worksop came twice from behind to beat rivals Frickley 3–2 in May 2012.

Bradford Park Avenue
In June 2012 Jackson joined Bradford Park Avenue. He joined Conference Premier club FC Halifax Town following a successful trial on 29 July 2014.

Buxton FC 
In 2016, Jackson joined Buxton F.C.
At the end of the 2016–17 season, Jackson was released by Buxton.

He subsequently signed for Matlock Town.

Personal life
Jackson is the half brother of former Bolton Wanderes and Preston North End striker Kevin Davies.

References

External links

1986 births
Living people
Footballers from Sheffield
English footballers
Association football forwards
Chesterfield F.C. players
Matlock Town F.C. players
Gainsborough Trinity F.C. players
Sheffield F.C. players
Worksop Town F.C. players
Bradford (Park Avenue) A.F.C. players
Belper Town F.C. players
Grantham Town F.C. players
FC Halifax Town players
Alfreton Town F.C. players
Buxton F.C. players
English Football League players
National League (English football) players
Northern Premier League players